International Federation of Surveyors (abbreviated FIG, after the ) is the UN-recognized global organization for the profession of surveying and related disciplines. It was established in 1878, and formed as a legal entity in 1999.  FIG has 106 member associations from 88 countries.

Membership
FIG has five categories of membership and two levels of honorary membership. 120 countries are represented in FIG through these various categories of membership:

Member associations: National associations representing one or more of the disciplines of surveying
Affiliates: Groups of surveyors or surveying organizations undertaking professional activities but not fulfilling the criteria for member associations
Corporate Members: Organisations, institutions or agencies which provide commercial services related to the profession of surveyor  
Academic members: Organisations, institutions or agencies which promote education or research in one or more of the disciplines of surveying
Correspondents: individuals in countries where there is no association or group of surveyors eligible for membership

FIG also has categories of honorary membership for past presidents and individuals who have materially assisted the development and promotion of the surveying profession at the international level.

Permanent institutions
FIG has set up the following permanent institutions:

The International Office of Cadastre and Land Records (Office International du Cadastre et du Régime Foncier – OICRF)
International Institution for the History of Surveying and Measurement. This was formally established in 1998, continuing the work of an ad hoc commission set up by FIG in about 1980.

Partner Organisations 
The FIG is a scientific associate member of the International Council for Science (ICSU).

See also 
American Congress on Surveying and Mapping
Canadian Institute of Geomatics

References

External links
 

Members of the International Council for Science
International professional associations
Geographic societies
Geodesy organizations
Surveying organizations
International geographic data and information organizations
Members of the International Science Council